The 2016 Hisense 4K TV 300 was the 11th stock car race of the 2016 NASCAR Xfinity Series and the 35th running of the event. The race was held on Saturday, in Fontana, California, at Charlotte Motor Speedway, a  permanent quad-shaped oval racetrack. The race took 206 laps to complete, including six overtime laps. NASCAR Cup Series driver Denny Hamlin took home the win, his first of the season and 15th all-time in the Xfinity Series. Richard Childress Racing's Austin Dillon and Team Penske's Joey Logano finished second and third, respectively.

Report

Background 

The race was held at Charlotte Motor Speedway, located in Concord, North Carolina. The speedway complex includes a 1.5-mile (2.4 km) quad-oval track that was utilized for the race, as well as a dragstrip and a dirt track. The speedway was built in 1959 by Bruton Smith and is considered the home track for NASCAR with many race teams based in the Charlotte metropolitan area. The track is owned and operated by Speedway Motorsports Inc. (SMI) with Marcus G. Smith serving as track president.

Entry list 

 (R) denotes rookie driver.
 (i) denotes driver who is ineligible for series driver points.

Practice

Practice 1 

Practice 1 results

Final Practice 

Qualifying 
T. J. Bell and Morgan Shepherd did not qualify. Carl Long, Martin Roy, Timmy Hill, Derrike Cope, Mike Harmon, Cody Ware, and Harrison Rhodes all qualified based on owner points.

Qualifying results

Race

Race Results

Race statistics 

 Lead changes: 21 among 10 different drivers
 Cautions/Laps: 8 for 54 laps
 Red flags: 0
 Time of race: 2 hours, 41 minutes and 54 seconds
 Average speed:

Media

Television 
The race was covered on Fox Sports 1 on television. Adam Alexander, Clint Bowyer and Michael Waltrip called the race in the booth. Jamie Little, Chris Neville, and Matt Yocum provided reports from Pit Road.

Radio 
PRN had the radio call for the race, which was also simulcast on Sirius XM NASCAR Radio.

Standings after the race 

Drivers' Championship standings

Manufacturers' Championship standings

Note: Only the first 12 positions are included for the driver standings.

References 

2016 NASCAR Xfinity Series
2016 in sports in North Carolina
May 2016 sports events in the United States
NASCAR races at Charlotte Motor Speedway